Dennis Gates (born January 14, 1980) is an American college basketball coach and former player who is the head coach of the Missouri Tigers men's basketball team.

Playing career
Gates played college basketball at California, where he was a two-time first-team All-Academic selection in the Pac-10, having graduated in three years, playing his senior season as a master's degree candidate. Gates was also a member of Cal's 2002 NCAA tournament team.

Coaching career
After graduation, Gates served as a coaching intern for the Los Angeles Clippers before heading to the college ranks for two graduate assistant coaching positions at Marquette and Florida State for a season each. He would return to his alma mater as a full assistant coach in 2005 under Ben Braun. From 2007 to 2009, Gates served as an assistant coach at Northern Illinois before another two-year stint as an assistant coach at Nevada. In 2011, he rejoined the Florida State staff as an assistant coach under Leonard Hamilton and was part of the Seminoles' 2011–12 ACC Tournament championship squad. He was a part of seven Seminole NCAA Tournament teams, including two Sweet 16 and one Elite Eight runs. During a January 10, 2017 contest between Florida State and Duke, Gates was shoved by Blue Devils guard Grayson Allen as the guard went for a loose ball near the Florida State bench. The clip garnered national attention, but Gates defended Allen in the aftermath stating he was not the victim of a dirty play.

Cleveland State

2019–20
On July 26, 2019, Gates was named 17th head coach in Cleveland State basketball history, replacing Dennis Felton. Gates won his first game as a college head coach on November 9, 2019, against the Division II Edinboro Fighting Scots, a 79–54 victory for the Vikings. Following his efforts in his first season, Gates was rewarded a share of the Horizon League Coach of the Year after Cleveland State won seven games in Horizon League play, the most for the school in five years. Gates is only the second head coach in Cleveland State history to be named Horizon League Coach of the Year, joining Gary Waters (2007–08). He was also the first head coach with an 11-win season to be named Horizon League Coach of the Year and only the second coach in league history to be awarded the honor with a sub-.500 record, joining 1980–81 Horizon League Coach of the Year Bob Staak (12-16, Xavier). Gates also coached junior forward Algevon Eichelberger to a Horizon League All-Third Team selection, as well as Torrey Patton to Player of the Week (Jan. 6) and Hugo Ferreira to Freshman of the Week (Feb. 25). Cleveland State saw significant improvements in his first season at the helm, winning three straight league games for the first time since the 2014–15 season and winning three straight non-conference games for the first time since the 2011–12 season.

2020–21
Gates began his second season as the Cleveland State head coach with an 0–3 record in non-conference play, with losses to Toledo, Ohio and Ohio State. They began their conference schedule by defeating Purdue Fort Wayne twice; the second game featured junior guard D’Moi Hodge breaking a school record 10 3-pointers and scoring 46 points, the 2nd most in a game in school history behind Franklin Edwards, who had 49 against Xavier. It was also the first time Cleveland State started 2–0 in Horizon League play since the 2014–15 season. Furthermore, after a January 15 road win at Wright State, Cleveland State started 9–0 in the Horizon League for the first time in program history. Gates also obtained the same number of wins as his successor, Dennis Felton, did at Cleveland State in 18 fewer games.

2021–22
On May 20, 2021, Gates signed a new six-year deal with Cleveland State. The new revised deal replaces the original five-year deal Gates signed in July 2019. The new deal is worth an estimated $3.2 million, or $550,000 a year, making Gates the highest-paid coach in the Horizon League.

Missouri

2022–23
On March 22, 2022, the University of Missouri announced Gates would be the men's basketball coach and was introduced in a press conference shortly after the announcement.  Gates is the program's 20th head coach. On Friday, March 10, 2023, the University of Missouri extended Gates’ contract through the 2028-2029 season,increasing his compensation to $4 million per year, with $100,000 annual increases.

Head coaching record

References

1980 births
Living people
20th-century African-American people
21st-century African-American sportspeople
African-American basketball players
American men's basketball coaches
Basketball coaches from Illinois
Basketball players from Chicago
California Golden Bears men's basketball coaches
California Golden Bears men's basketball players
Cleveland State Vikings men's basketball coaches
Florida State Seminoles men's basketball coaches
Marquette Golden Eagles men's basketball coaches
Missouri Tigers men's basketball coaches
Nevada Wolf Pack men's basketball coaches
Northern Illinois Huskies men's basketball coaches